This is a list of members of the South Australian Legislative Council from 1918 to 1921.

 Central No. 2 District MLC Frederick Samuel Wallis was expelled from the Labor Party in September 1918. He served out the remainder of his term as an independent.
 Liberal Union MLC Joseph Botterill died on 17 August 1920. Thomas McCallum won the resulting by-election on 9 October.
 In August 1920, the Liberal Union refused to accept the preselection nomination of Southern District MLC Alfred von Doussa for the 1921 election after he refused to sign a pledge that he would not contest the election if he lost preselection. Following his preselection loss, von Doussa acted as an independent for the remainder of his term while running for re-election.

References
Parliament of South Australia — Statistical Record of the Legislature

Members of South Australian parliaments by term
20th-century Australian politicians